Bradley E. Aitken (born October 30, 1967) is a Canadian former professional ice hockey Left Wing who played 14 games in the National Hockey League.

Playing career 
Aitken spent parts of two seasons in the National Hockey League, although the majority of his career took place in the minors or Europe.  He was selected by the Pittsburgh Penguins in the third round of the 1986 NHL Entry Draft, 46th overall, and played for Pittsburgh before he was traded to the Edmonton Oilers in exchange for Kim Issel in March 1991. Aitken played just 3 games with the Oilers before he was returned to the minors. He was also briefly the property of the Toronto Maple Leafs, but was unable to crack their lineup.

On November 25, 2013, over twenty years since his retirement, Aitken was revealed to be a claimant against a group of former NHL players, who filed a suit against the NHL in relation to player safety in concussions.

Career statistics

Transactions 
 On June 21, 1986 the Pittsburgh Penguins selected Brad Aitken in the third-round (#46 overall) of the 1986 NHL draft.
 On March 5, 1991 the Pittsburgh Penguins traded Brad Aitken to the Edmonton Oilers in exchange for Kim Issel.
 On July 30, 1991 the Toronto Maple Leafs signed free agent Brad Aitken.

References

External links 
 

1967 births
Canadian ice hockey left wingers
Cape Breton Oilers players
Edmonton Oilers players
Fort Wayne Komets players
Kansas City Blades players
Living people
Muskegon Lumberjacks players
Peterborough Petes (ice hockey) players
Phoenix Roadrunners (IHL) players
Pittsburgh Penguins draft picks
Pittsburgh Penguins players
Sault Ste. Marie Greyhounds players
Sportspeople from Scarborough, Toronto
Ice hockey people from Toronto
St. John's Maple Leafs players